Now Hear This was an LP album by The Hi-Lo's released in 1957 by Columbia Records, as catalog number CL-1023.

Track listing

It was combined with the Hi-Lo's 1960 album, Broadway Playbill, into a compact disc released by Collectables Records on October 17, 2000.

External links
Description of the album
Description of the CD including this album and Now Hear This

The Hi-Lo's albums
1957 albums
Columbia Records albums